Markos Vellidis (born 4 April 1987) is a Greek professional footballer who plays as a goalkeeper for Super League 2 club Iraklis.

Club career

Panathinaikos

Vellidis began his career by signing with Panathinaikos in August 2005. In 2006–07 season, he went on loan to Koropi, with playing in 17 matches. The next season, he went on loan to Diagoras, and played in 36 matches.

Diagoras

In 2008, Diagoras bought Vellidis from Panathinaikos. He made 62 league appearances for the club. He was a good penalty-stopper and was popular with fans. There was minor interest from some teams, but the biggest was by Aris. Diagoras' fans were very proud for their goalkeeper, because they wanted Markos to show his talent and value in a big team. And this team, was Aris. Vellidis made his dream fact, and signed with a team with many success in Greece and Europe.

Aris

His very good appearances for Diagoras were rewarded by a signing with Aris on 15 June 2010, getting the number 1.

2010–11 season
In the 2010–2011 season, Vellidis played 4 matches for Aris, bringing good performances. These performances were the reason for that Vellidis was recommended as a great talent and also was known that behind Sifakis was another very good goalkeeper.

2011–12 season
In the 2011–2012 season, first choice goalkeeper of Aris, Michalis Sifakis, had medical problems, which sidelined him for 5–8 months. Vellidis played his first of the season on 2 October 2011 against Skoda Xanthi in Kleanthis Vikelidis, giving a fine performance, with having a clean sheet. Since then, Vellidis is the first goalkeeper in the team. This season was the best of Vellidis's career so far.

2012–13 season
Aris was in difficult times, but Vellidis was one of those who stayed loyal to Aris. He was the first choice goalkeeper and the fans wanted he to stay for a lot years. He is the young star of Aris, along with Giannis Gianniotas. He had an argue with coach Makis Katsavakis just before the match against Panionios in Kleanthis Vikelidis Stadium. However, it was decided that Vellidis will stay in team.

PAS Giannina
Vellidis signed for PAS Giannina on 13 June 2013 on a 2-year contract. His first appearance with the club was on 18 August 2013 in an away 3–3 draw against Asteras Tripoli. Being active for almost five years in the Superleague Greece, Vellidis could be a valuable asset for any club, therefore as Balazs Megyeri's contract expires in summer and it probably will not be renewed, Olympiacos are already looking for his replacement and the Greek player is one of the candidates.

According to various sources Vellidis is in Olympiacos transfer shortlist and the Greek champions are watching him closely. Balazs Megyeri's contract expires in summer and it probably will not be renewed. Therefore, Olympiacos are already looking for his replacement and the Greek player is one of the candidates. Being one of the most stable and most valuable players of PAS Giannina F.C. during the last seasons, and in any case, the 28-year-old keeper cashed his offer with a new three-year contract for an undisclosed fee which will tie him with the club till 2018.

He started the 2015–16 season being the MVP of the 2nd day of the Superleague Greece in a victorious 3–1 home win against PAOK, as the keeper of PAS Giannina kept upright team with fantastic chips after the first half-hour, when his opponent pushed too much and lost significant opportunities for the equalizer. From the 30th minute until the end of the half the Greek international showed superb reactions to shots from Róbert Mak, Erik Sabo and Marin Leovac.

PAOK
On 19 January 2016, Vellidis signed a half-year contract with PAOK with a possible extension for two more years, for an undisclosed fee. On 24 January 2016, he made his debut with the club in a derby match against rivals AEK Athens. In summer 2016, the coming of Serbian international Željko Brkić and the fact that Panagiotis Glykos seemed to be the first goalie for PAOK coach Vladimir Ivić created an extra pressure to Vellidis for the first goalie of the new season. As a result, he played only one game for the 2016–17 season in a 7–0 away Greek Cup win against Panelefsiniakos F.C. On 31 January 2017, Vellidis solved his contract with the club.

On 2 March 2017, English Championship club Nottingham Forest have taken Vellidis on trial. The 29-year-old left Greek side PAOK at the end of the January transfer window, enabling him to sign for another club before the end of the campaign. From the beginning of 2017, he started training as a free agent with ex-club PAS Giannina.

PAS Giannina
On 28 June 2017, he officially included in the roster of his ex-club PAS Giannina, but he was never the same, and after some poor appearances, he was replaced by second choice goalie, Neofytos Michael. On 7 May 2019 after the relegation, Vellidis mutually solved his contract with the club.

Lamia
On 19 June 2019, he officially included in the roster of Superleague Greece club Lamia signing a two years' contract for an undisclosed fee. On 6 November 2019, 
the serial of the international goalie with Lamia came to an end in a joint consent, on the occasion of the away game against champions PAOK.

Olympiakos Nicosia
On 8 January 2020 he signed for Cypriot First Division club Olympiakos Nicosia.

Veria
On 22 August 2020 he signed for Super League 2 club Veria F.C.

International career
On 10 August 2012 Greece head coach Fernando Santos announced the first call up of Vellidis for the friendly match against Norway. He made his international debut on 16 June 2015 in a friendly away match against Poland, replacing Stefanos Kapino at the end of the match.

Career statistics

Honours
Super League Greece Goalkeeper of the Year: 2014–15 with PAS Giannina
Super League Greece Team of the Year: 2014–15

References

External links

1987 births
Living people
Greek footballers
Greek expatriate footballers
Association football goalkeepers
Panathinaikos F.C. players
Aris Thessaloniki F.C. players
PAS Giannina F.C. players
PAOK FC players
Koropi F.C. players
Diagoras F.C. players
PAS Lamia 1964 players
Olympiakos Nicosia players
Veria NFC players
Iraklis Thessaloniki F.C. players
Super League Greece players
Gamma Ethniki players
Football League (Greece) players
Cypriot First Division players
Super League Greece 2 players
Greek expatriate sportspeople in Cyprus
Expatriate footballers in Cyprus
Greece international footballers
Footballers from Kastoria